Seven Seconds is an American crime drama streaming television series, based on the Russian film The Major written and directed by Yuri Bykov, that premiered on February 23, 2018, on Netflix. The series, which is created, executive produced, and showrun by Veena Sud, follows the people involved in investigating the death of a Black teenager and his family as they reel after the loss. On April 18, 2018, Netflix confirmed there would not be a second season, deeming it a limited series.

Premise
Peter Jablonski, a white Polish-American Jersey City Police Department (named "New Jersey Police" in the movie) Narcotics Detective, accidentally hits and critically injures Brenton Butler—a Black teenager from Jersey City, New Jersey—with his car. Jablonski calls his fellow police officers that work Narcotics Division with him to the scene. They assume Brenton is dead and a cover-up ensues. Racial tensions explode in the face of injustice and the absence of quick resolution of the case.

Cast and characters

Main
 Clare-Hope Ashitey as K.J. Harper
 Beau Knapp as Peter Jablonski
 Michael Mosley as Joe “Fish” Rinaldi
 David Lyons as Mike DiAngelo
 Russell Hornsby as Isaiah Butler
 Raúl Castillo as Felix Osorio
 Patrick Murney as Manny Wilcox
 Zackary Momoh as Seth Butler
 Michelle Veintimilla as Marie Jablonski
 Regina King as Latrice Butler

Recurring
 Corey Champagne as Kadeuce Porter
 Nadia Alexander as Nadine MacAllister
 Coley Mustafa Speaks as Messiah
 Adriana DeMeo as Teresa
 Jeremy Davidson as James Connelly
 Sawyer Niehaus as Maggie Rinaldi
 Gretchen Mol as Sam Hennessy
 Lou Martini, Jr. as Barry Piumetti

Episodes

Production

Development

On October 18, 2016, it was announced that Netflix had given the production a one season series order consisting of 10 episodes. The series was created by Veena Sud with Gavin O'Connor attached to direct. Sud and O’Connor were expected to executive produce alongside Lawrence Bender, Kevin Brown, and Alex Reznik. Production companies involved with the show include Fox 21 TV Studios.

On April 18, 2018, Netflix announced they were not renewing the series for a second season.

Casting
On October 25, 2016, it was announced that David Lyons and Beau Knapp had joined the show as series regulars. On November 17, 2016, Russell Hornsby, Raul Castillo, and Zackary Momoh joined the main cast. Later that month, Michael Mosley and Patrick Murney were cast as series regulars as well. On December 1, 2016, it was confirmed that Regina King had been cast in the series regular role of Latrice Butler. A few weeks later,
Clare-Hope Ashitey was cast in the series' lead role of K.J. Harper.

Release
On January 24, 2018, Netflix released the official trailer for the series and a collection of first look images.

Reception

Critical response
The series has received a positive reception from critics upon its premiere. On the review aggregation website Rotten Tomatoes, the series is certified fresh, holding a 78% approval rating with an average rating of 6.02 out of 10 based on 44 reviews. The website's critical consensus reads, "Seven Seconds is undermined by unlikable characters with somewhat predictable arcs, but its grim reflections of societal and racial division are brought to life by able performers and a fearless overall narrative." Metacritic, which uses a weighted average, assigned the series a score of 68 out of 100 based on 20 critics, indicating "generally favorable reviews."

Awards and nominations

References

External links
 
 

2018 American television series debuts
2018 American television series endings
2010s American crime drama television series
Crime drama web series
English-language Netflix original programming
Live action television shows based on films
Television shows set in New Jersey
Television series by 20th Century Fox Television
Primetime Emmy Award-winning television series